Primus is an American first-run syndicated undersea adventure series which aired in 1971–1972. It told the adventures of Carter Primus (Robert Brown). The series was produced by Ivan Tors and one season of 26 episodes was filmed.

Cast
 Robert Brown as Carter Primus
 Will Kuluva as Charlie Kingman 
 Eva Renzi as Toni Hayden

Episodes

In other media
A paperback Primus novel by Bradford Street and Ivan Tors was published by Bantam Books in 1971.

Charlton Comics published a short lived Primus comic book (7 issues - February 1972 to October 1972 ).

References

External links
 

1971 American television series debuts
1972 American television series endings
1970s American drama television series
English-language television shows
First-run syndicated television programs in the United States
Television series by Metromedia